A wire loop game is a game which involves guiding a metal loop (a 'probe') along a serpentine length of wire without touching the loop to the wire. The loop and wire are connected to a power source in such a way that, if they touch, they form a closed electric circuit. The circuit is connected to a light or sound-emitting device of some sort, so that when the loop and the wire touch, the light-emitting device will light up, and the sound-emitting device will make a sound, traditionally a buzzing noise. In commercial implementations of the game the wire is usually bent along a single axis.

This game is also called a steady-hand game, a buzz wire game or an electronic loop game.

Virtual versions of this game exist, in which the pointer takes the place of the wire loop and must be guided down a narrow, twisting path without touching the sides. Both versions require well-developed hand–eye coordination. The difficulty of any particular game depends in part on the shape of the twisted wire and the size of the loop.

References

Games of physical skill